Bipartivalva is a genus of moths belonging to the subfamily Olethreutinae of the family Tortricidae.

Species
Bipartivalva aquilana Kuznetzov, 1988
Bipartivalva eurypinax (Meyrick in Caradja & Meyrick, 1937)

See also
List of Tortricidae genera

References

External links
tortricidae.com

Tortricidae genera
Olethreutinae